The 1985 FINA Men's Water Polo World Cup was the fourth edition of the event, organised by the world's governing body in aquatics, the International Swimming Federation (FINA). The event took place in Duisburg, West Germany and was contested at the Schwimmstadion pool. The eight participating teams, the first eight of the 1984 Summer Olympics, played a round robin to decide the winner of what would be a bi-annual event until 1999.

Results Matrix

Final standings

Final ranking

References

1985
F
W
1985